Illich is both a given name and a surname. Notable people with the name include:

Illich Guardiola (born 1972), American voice actor
Isaak Illich Rubin (1886–1937), Russian economist
Ivan Illich (1926–2002), Austrian philosopher and anarchist social critic

See also
Vladislav Illich-Svitych